The Thomas Pringle Award is an annual award for work published in newspapers, periodicals and journals. They are awarded on a rotation basis for: a book, play, film or TV review; a literary article or substantial book review; an article on English education; a short story or one-act play; one or more poems. It is named in honour of Thomas Pringle and administered by the English Academy of South Africa.

Award winners
2020
 Tevya Turok Shapiro – Reviews
 Bhekisiwe Petersen – Literary Article
2019
 Reviews – No award
 Educational article – No award
 Sue de Groot – Poetry in a journal 	
2018
Tymon Smith – Reviews
Rosemary Gray & Jacomein Van Niekerk – Literary article
Short story/play – No award
2017
Karina Magdalena Szczurek – Reviews
Marshall Maposa – Educational article
Peter Anderson – Poetry in a journal
2016
Geoffrey Haresnape – Reviews
Michael Titlestad – Academic article
Nick Mulgrew – Short story/short play	
2015
John Bojé – Reviews
Suriamurthee – Educational Article
Maistry Rethabile Masilo – Poetry in Journals
2014
Reviews – No award
Gareth Cornwell – Literary Article
Anthony Akeman – Short Story/One-Act play
2013
Reviews – No award
Elizabeth Pretorius – Educational Article
Beverly Rycroft – Poetry in Journals	
2012
Mary Corrigall – Reviews
Lara Buxbaum – Literary Article 
Lauren van Vuuren – Short story
2011 
Mary Corrigall – Reviews 
Aslam Fataar and Charles van Renen – Educational article
Kelwyn Sole – Poetry
2010
Michiel Heyns – Reviews
Leon de Kock – Literary Article
Stephen Watson – Short Story
2009
Denise Newfield and Robert Maungedzo – Educational Article
Mxolisi Nyezwa – Poetry
2008
 Mary Corrigall – Reviews
 Jamie McGregor – Literary Article
David Medalie – Short story
2007
Chris Thurman – Reviews
Ambrose Chimbganda – Educational article
Chris Mann – Poetry
2006
Michiel Heyns – Reviews
David Schalkwyk – Literary article
Ken Barris – Short story
2005
Barry Ronge – Reviews
Bernat Kruger – Poetry
Carolyn McKinney – Educational Article
2004
Khadija Magardie – Reviews
Ananda Cersh – Short Story
Isabel Hofmeyr – Literary Article
2003
Keith Clark & Sandra McKay – Literary Article
Jane Rosenthal – Short Story
Rustum Kozain – Poetry
2002
Robert Kirby & Felicity Wood – Educational Article
Amanda Gersh – Review
Dan Wylie – Short Story
2001
Shaun de Waal – Reviews
Nicole Geslin & Roderick Wade – Educational Article
Shabbir Banoobhai – Poetry
2000
Eve Bertelsen – Reviews
Peter Merrington – Literary Article
Evan Kaplan – Short Story
1999
Alexander Sudheim – Reviews
Christine Mary Boughey – Educational article
Brian Walter – Poetry
1998
Zakes Mda – Reviews
Kelwyn Sole – Literary Article
Lerothodi La Pula – Short Story
1997
Shaun de Waal – Reviews
Kathy Luckett – Educational articles
Don Maclennan – Poetry
1996
Robert Kirby – Reviews
Isabel Hofmeyr – Literary articles
Peter Merrington – Short Story
1995
Bafana Khumalo – Reviews
Christa van der Walt – Educational article
Leon de Kock – Poetry
1994
Stephen Gray – Reviews
Michiel Heyns – Literary articles
Ivan Vladislavic – Short Stories and one-act plays
1993
Janice Farquharson – Reviews
Brenda Leibowitz – English in education
Tatamkulu Afrika – Poetry
1992
Alexander Johnston – Reviews
David Schalkwyk – Literary articles
Andries Walter Oliphant – Short Story
1991
Charlotte Bauer – Reviews
Gregory Cunningham – English in education
Tatumkulu Afrika – Poetry
1990
No award – Reviews
Dorothy Driver – Literary articles
Patrick Cullinan – Short stories
1989
Stephen Gray – Reviews
Binkie Marwick – English in education
Douglas Livingstone – Poetry
1988
No award – Reviews
John M Coetzee – Literary articles
Rose Zwi – Short stories
1987
David Williams – Reviews
No award – English in education
Lionel Abrahams & Mark Swift – Poetry
1986
Gus Silber – Reviews
Jan Gorek & Njabulo Ndebele – Literary articles
1985
Robert Greig – Reviews
Karen Learmont-Batley – English in education
Patrick Cullinan – Poetry
1984
John van Zyl – Reviews
Graham Pechey – Literary articles
Sheila Roberts – Short stories
1983
Cherry Clayton – Reviews
Elwyn Jenkins – English in education
Patrick Cullinan – Poetry
1982
Peter Wilhem – Reviews
John Coetzee – Literary articles
Greg Latter – Short Stories
1981
Andre Lemmer – Short stories, one act plays, general essays
Mtutuzeli Matshoba – English in education
Peter Strauss – Poetry
1980
W H Bizley – Literary articles
Peter Michael – Film review
Creative writing – No award	
1979
Brian Cheadle – Literary articles
J A Maimane – Creative writing (short story)
No award – short stories
1978
Colin Gardner – Literary articles
Lynne Bryer – Book reviews
Bruce Hewitt – Creative writing (Poetry)
1977
Brian Cheadle – Literary articles
Peter Reynolds – Play review
Lionel Abrahams & Sipho Sepamla – Creative writing (Poems)
1976
Robert Greig – Play review
Anthony Delius – Creative writing (Essay)
No award – Literary articles
1975
Pauline Fletcher – Literary article
Phyllis Lewsen – Book review
Tess Koller – Creative writing (Poetry)
1974
Peter Horn – Literary articles
Percy Baneshik – Play review
No award – Creative writing
1973
Peter Strauss – Literary article
Alan Paton – Book review
Christopher Hope – Creative Writing (Poetry)
1972
Jeff Opland – Literary article
Peter Hawthorne – Book review
Robert Dederick – Creative writing (Poetry)
1971
Peter Strauss- Literary article
Fleur de Villiers – Play review
1970
Owen Williams – Play review
1969
Nadine Gordimer – Creative writing (short story)
1968
J A Berthoud – Literary article
1967
Allister Sparks – Newspaper article
1964
Mary Morison Webster – Book Review
1963
Ramsay Milne – Editorial or newspaper article

See also
Olive Schreiner Prize
Percy FitzPatrick Award
Sol Plaatje Prize for Translation

Notes

South African literary awards
Awards established in 1962
Fiction awards
Poetry awards
Dramatist and playwright awards
Short story awards
South African literary events